Alan F. Schatzberg is an American psychiatrist. He was the 136th president of the American Psychiatric Association (2009–2010). Since 1991, he has been the Kenneth T. Norris Jr . Professor of Psychiatry and Behavioral Sciences at Stanford University School of Medicine, and he was chair of the department from 1991 to 2010. He has received multiple national and international awards for his work as an investigator in the biology and treatment of depression. He is also the co-editor-in-chief of the Journal of Psychiatric Research, along with Florian Holsboer.  He received an honorary doctorate from the Medical University of Vienna in 2011.

References

External links 
Psychiatrists Propose Revisions to Diagnosis Manual. via PBS Newshour, Feb 10, 2010 (interviews Schatzberg and Allen Frances on some of the main changes proposed in the DSM-5 draft)

Living people
American psychiatrists
Medical journal editors
Stanford University School of Medicine faculty
Presidents of the American Psychiatric Association
Year of birth missing (living people)
Members of the National Academy of Medicine